St Lawrence Jewry next Guildhall is a Church of England guild church in the City of London on Gresham Street, next to Guildhall. It was destroyed in the Great Fire of London in 1666, and rebuilt to the designs of Sir Christopher Wren. It is the official church of the Lord Mayor of London.

History

Medieval era
The church was originally built in the twelfth century and dedicated to St Lawrence; the weathervane of the present church is in the form of his instrument of  martyrdom, the gridiron. The church is near the former medieval Jewish ghetto, which was centred on the street named Old Jewry. From 1280 it was an advowson held by Balliol College, Oxford.

It is thought that the unusual alignment of the church may be because it was built on the site of the London Roman Amphitheatre, which was rediscovered as recently as 1988. Its remains can now be visited beneath the Guildhall Art Gallery.

Sir Thomas More preached in the old church on this site.

17th century
In 1618 the church was repaired, and all the windows filled with stained glass paid for by individual donors.

The medieval church was destroyed in the Great Fire of London   and rebuilt by Christopher Wren between 1670 and 1687. The parish was united with that of St Mary Magdalen, Milk Street, which was not rebuilt. The church is entirely faced in stone, with a grand east front, on which four attached Corinthian columns, raised on a basement, support a pediment placed against a high attic. George Godwin, writing in 1839, described the details of this facade as displaying " a purity of feeling almost Grecian", while pointing out that Wren's pediment acts only as a superficial adornment to the wall, rather than, as in Classical architecture, forming an extension of the roof.

Inside, Wren's church has an aisle on the north side only, divided from the nave by Corinthian columns, carrying an entablature that continues around the walls of the main body of the church, where it is supported on pilasters. The ceiling is divided into sunken panels, ornamented with wreaths and branches. The church is 81 feet long and 68 feet wide.

20th century
The church suffered extensive damage during the Blitz on 29 December 1940,  and after the war the City of London Corporation agreed to restore it as Balliol College had no funds to do so. It was restored in 1957 by the architect Cecil Brown to Wren's original design. It is now a guild church which does not have its own parish and is not responsible to the parish authorities in its locality; it does not have to hold Sunday services.

The church was described by Sir John Betjeman as "very municipal, very splendid." It was designated a Grade I listed building on 4 January 1950.

The church was the burial place of John Tillotson, the Archbishop of Canterbury from 1691 to 1694; and of merchant Francis Levett, as well as the site of the wedding of his niece Ann Levett, daughter of William Levett, Dean of Bristol and former Principal of Magdalen Hall, Oxford.

The church is used by the New Zealand Society UK, who celebrate Waitangi Day here in February each year.

Catherine Ennis was the organist here until her death on 24 December 2020.

Vicars (incomplete list)
1566–1570 William Palmer
1578–81 Samuel Perkins
1650–1656 Richard Vines was minister
1657–1659 Edward Reynolds 
1661–1662 Seth Ward
1662–1668 John Wilkins
1668–1683 Benjamin Whichcote
1686–1721 John Mapletoft
1857–1872 Benjamin Cowie
1898–1920 James Stephen Barrass
2007–Present The Reverend Canon David Parrott

See also

 St Lawrence and Mary Magdalene Drinking Fountain
 List of churches and cathedrals of London
 List of Christopher Wren churches in London

Notes

External links

St Lawrence Jewry at London City Churches website

Rebuilt churches in the United Kingdom
Christopher Wren church buildings in London
Church of England church buildings in the City of London
Religious buildings and structures completed in 1687
17th-century Church of England church buildings
Religious organizations established in the 12th century
English Baroque church buildings
Lawrence
Grade I listed churches in the City of London
Diocese of London